Au Kin-yee is a Hong Kong screenwriter.

She is a long-time screenwriter for films directed by Johnnie To and/or Wai Ka-Fai of Milkyway Image and frequently works alongside writers Wai Ka-Fai, Yau Nai-Hoi and Yip Tin-Shing.

Filmography

Awards and nominations

References

External links
 

Hong Kong people
Hong Kong women writers
Hong Kong screenwriters
Living people
Year of birth missing (living people)